Club Manuel Belgrano is an Argentine rugby union and field hockey club. The rugby team currently plays at Torneo de la URBA Grupo II, the second division of the Unión de Rugby de Buenos Aires league system. The hockey team plays at the tournaments organised by the Buenos Aires Hockey Association.

The institution is headquartered in the neighborhood of Saavedra, Buenos Aires, while its rugby stadium is located in Ingeniero Maschwitz, Greater Buenos Aires.

The club has around 700 rugby players and 250 field hockey players registered.

History
In 1955 the Marist Brothers College Manuel Belgrano registered a rugby team to participate in the tournaments organized by the Unión Argentina de Rugby, under the name of "Los Tábanos" ("The Horseflies"). On October 1, 1958, the club was officially founded as "Club Manuel Belgrano", being soon accepted by the Union and also supported by other clubs such as Club Atlético San Isidro and Obras Sanitarias.

On May 2, 1959, Manuel Belgrano played its first match against Atalaya. The following years the team participated in the "Classification" zone until 1962 when Belgrano proclaimed champion and was promoted to the "Ascenso" level. In 2007 the club reached the first division where they played until in 2011 Manuel Belgrano was relegated to Grupo II, but after one season, Manuel Belgrano promoted again to Grupo I. Patricio Albacete is the club's most famous player.

José Mostany (1986–87), Patricio Albacete (2003–14) and Martín Ignes (2012), were players of the Argentina national team.

References

External links
 

m
m
m
m